is a passenger railway station located in Minami-ku of the city of Okayama, Okayama Prefecture, Japan. It is operated by the West Japan Railway Company (JR West).

Lines

Station layout
The station consists of two opposed ground-level side platforms connected by a footbridge. There are two entrances and exits near the center of both platforms (the front entrance and the station square rotary are on the outbound platform side). There is a waiting area on each platform. The station is unattended.

Platforms

Adjacent stations

History
It was renamed 1 July 1914. With the privatization of Japanese National Railways (JNR) on 1 April 1987, the station came under the control of JR West.

Passenger statistics
In fiscal 2019, the station was used by an average of 282 passengers daily

Surrounding area
Hikozaki Shell Mound (National Historic Site)
Okayama Municipal Hikozaki Elementary School

See also
List of railway stations in Japan

References

External links

 JR West Station Official Site

Railway stations in Okayama
Uno Line
Railway stations in Japan opened in 1910